Enrico Fabris (born 5 October 1981) is an Italian former long track speed skater who has won three World Cup races and became the first European Allround Champion from Italy when he won the 2006 European Championships one month before the Winter Olympics in Turin. In 2007 he won also the silver medal and in 2008 the bronze medal. Fabris is also a six-time Italian Allround Champion.

Career
At the 2006 Olympics he won a bronze medal in the men's 5,000 m event, Italy's first-ever Olympic medal in speed skating. Five days later, he was in the winning team on the team pursuit event, to claim Italy's first Olympic speed skating gold. With a time of one minute, 45.97 seconds in the 1,500 m race, Fabris claimed his third medal and defeated American favourites Shani Davis and Chad Hedrick to become the first non-American to win an individual men's event through the first four races of the Turin Winter Games. On 10 November 2007 he took the 5,000 meter world record with 6:07.40, which he lost one week later, when Sven Kramer skated faster in Calgary.

Records

Personal records

 he is in 12th position in the Adelskalender with 146.619 points.

Source: SpeedskatingResults.com

World records 

Source: SpeedSkatingStats.com

See also
 Legends of Italian sport - Walk of Fame
List of multiple Olympic gold medalists at a single Games

References

External links
 
 

1981 births
Living people
Italian male speed skaters
People from Asiago
Speed skaters at the 2002 Winter Olympics
Speed skaters at the 2006 Winter Olympics
Speed skaters at the 2010 Winter Olympics
Olympic gold medalists for Italy
Olympic bronze medalists for Italy
Olympic speed skaters of Italy
Olympic medalists in speed skating
World record setters in speed skating
Medalists at the 2006 Winter Olympics
Universiade medalists in speed skating
World Allround Speed Skating Championships medalists
Universiade gold medalists for Italy
Universiade bronze medalists for Italy
Competitors at the 2005 Winter Universiade
Speed skaters at the 2007 Winter Universiade
Speed skaters of Fiamme Oro
Medalists at the 2007 Winter Universiade
Sportspeople from the Province of Vicenza
21st-century Italian people